The Lebanon metropolitan area may refer to:

The Lebanon, Pennsylvania metropolitan area, United States
The Lebanon, Missouri micropolitan area, United States
The Claremont–Lebanon micropolitan area, New Hampshire and Vermont, United States, formerly the Lebanon micropolitan area

See also
Lebanon (disambiguation)